Bush Studies is a short story collection by Barbara Baynton that presents Australian bush life in the early colonial period as dangerous and isolating for the women.

Analysis

Baynton's short stories and novel were noted at the time of their publication, and since, for their grim realism and depiction of female suffering.  In contrast to other writers of "pioneer bush" narratives, this suffering is portrayed by Baynton as arising not only from the harsh environment, but from male attitudes and power. This represents an alternative view to the romanticism of the bush and "mateship" propagated through periodicals such the Bulletin, and by bush balladeers such as Henry Lawson and Banjo Patterson.

Bush Studies was first published in London in 1902, as Bayton was unable to find an Australian publisher.

Contents
 "A Dreamer"
 "Squeaker's Mate"
 "Scrammy 'And"
 "Billy Skywonkie"
 "Bush Church"
 "The Chosen Vessel"

Other works (selected)

Novel
 Human Toll (1907)

Collections
 Cobbers (1917)

Individual works
 Fragments: 1 Day-Birth (1899) - poem
 A Dreamer (1902) - short story

References

External links
 Full text - Sydney University SETIS - Bush Studies by Barbara Baynton
 
 Barbara Baynton: Liar or Truth-teller
 * 

1902 short story collections
Australian short story collections